Pressure Cooker is an album by saxophonist Junior Cook recorded in 1977 and released on the Catalyst label.

Track listing 
 "Sweet Lotus Lips" (Mickey Tucker) – 5:27
 "The Crucifier" (Tucker) – 4:43
 "The 8th Cat" (Tex Allen) – 4:54
 "Not Quite That" (Garnett Brown) – 4:30
 "Yardbird Suite" (Charlie Parker) – 8:52
 "Moment to Moment (Part One)" (Henry Mancini) – 3:15
 "Moment to Moment (Part Two)" (Mancini) – 8:48

Personnel 
Junior Cook – tenor saxophone
Mickey Tucker – piano
Juini Booth (tracks 2 & 3), Cecil McBee (tracks 1 & 4–7) – bass
Leroy Williams – drums

References 

Junior Cook albums
1977 albums
Catalyst Records (jazz) albums